Blaxhall Common is a nature reserve in the parish of Blaxhall in the  East Suffolk District of Suffolk. The reserve is owned by Blaxhall Parish Council and managed by Suffolk Wildlife Trust. It is designated a  biological Site of Special Scientific Interest as Blaxhall Heath. It is part of the Sandlings Special Protection Area under the European Union Directive on the Conservation of Wild Birds, and of the Suffolk Coast and Heaths Area of Outstanding Natural Beauty. A Bronze Age bowl barrow is a Scheduled Monument.

Location
The site is located on the Suffolk Sandlings, an area of sandy soil and glacial geology stretching along the Suffolk coast from Ipswich to Southwold. The traditional land cover was lowland dry heathland, but much of this landscape has been destroyed with isolated areas, such as at Blaxhall, surviving. The site is bordered to three sides by the Sandlings Forest SSSI.

It falls on the edge of the Suffolk Coast and Heaths Area of Outstanding Natural Beauty (AONB).

Plant and wildlife
The heath is mainly heathers with a mosaic of heather and acidic grassland habitats. The Silver-studded blue butterfly was reintroduced at the site in 2007. Bird species present include nightjar, woodlark and tree pipit with reptiles such as the common lizard and adder Vipera berus established on the site. There are also colonies of solitary bees and ant-lions.

The heath is managed through seasonal cutting of vegetation, especially invasive species, in order to maintain a variety of habitats. Hebridean sheep and Exmoor ponies have also been introduced at the site in order to assist management. A car park is maintained by the Suffolk Wildlife Trust to allow access to the reserve.

Archaeology
The barrow is a scheduled ancient monument. The common includes a number of Iron Age sites as well as a wide World War II anti-glider ditch. This provides habitats for solitary bees and lizards.

See also
List of Sites of Special Scientific Interest in Suffolk
Suffolk Coast and Heaths

References

Sites of Special Scientific Interest in Suffolk